Sir John (James) O'Reilly DSc PhD CEng FREng, FRAes (born 1 December 1946) was Vice-Chancellor of Cranfield University from 2006 to 2013. He is the son of Patrick William and Dorothy Ann O’Reilly. He has one son and one daughter.

Career
He was a student apprentice at the Royal Radar Establishment in Malvern from 1963–69. He later attended Brunel University gaining a BTech degree in 1969 and a DSc in 1991. He was a Lecturer and later Senior Lecturer at the  University of Essex 1972–85 and Professor of Electronic Engineering from 1985–94. He was Head of the School of Electronic Engineering and Computer Systems at the University college of North Wales, later the University of North Wales, Bangor 1985–93 where he gained a PhD in 1982. He was Principal Research Fellow at British Telecom Labs from 1993–94. He was Professor of Telecommunications from 1994–2001 and head of the Department of Electronic and Electrical Engineering, 1997–2001 at University College London. He then became Chief Executive of EPSRC.

He later became Vice-Chancellor of Cranfield University from 2006–2013.  He was knighted in 2007.

He left Cranfield and became Director General, Knowledge and Innovation, BIS, from 2013 – 2015.

Since 2015, he is Chairman of NICC Ltd., - a company which develops interoperability standards for public communications networks and services in the UK.

In 2019, he named an Honorary Citizen of Singapore for contributions to Singapore in engineering research and development.

Publications
Telecommunication Principles, 1984
Optimisation Methods in Electronics and Communications, 1984 (edited with K. W. Cattermole)
Problems of Randomness in Communication Engineering, 1984
Has also contributed numerous conference papers.

References

People associated with Cranfield University
Alumni of Brunel University London
People associated with the University of Essex
People associated with Bangor University
People associated with University College London
1946 births
Living people
Academics of Cranfield University
Knights Bachelor
Honorary Citizens of Singapore